Sundamomum is a genus of flowering plants belonging to the family Zingiberaceae.

Its native range is Thailand to Western Malesia.

Species:

Sundamomum borealiborneense 
Sundamomum calyptratum 
Sundamomum dictyocoleum 
Sundamomum durum 
Sundamomum flavoalbum 
Sundamomum hastilabium 
Sundamomum laxesquamosum 
Sundamomum longipedunculatum 
Sundamomum luteum 
Sundamomum macroglossa 
Sundamomum oligophyllum 
Sundamomum paucifolium 
Sundamomum pseudofoetens 
Sundamomum somniculosum

References

Alpinioideae
Zingiberaceae genera